The Motion Makes Me Last is an EP from Portland, OR ambient musician Matthew Cooper, under the name Eluvium. This EP is a follow-up to the Leaves Eclipse the Light EP released a few months earlier.
The album features the second track from Similes, 2 unreleased instrumental / ambient tracks and a remix of "Leaves Eclipse the Light" by Nick Zammuto from The Books.

Track listing
 "The Motion Makes Me Last" – 5:25
 "Crash Deconstructed" – 5:36
 "Remnant Signals" – 5:06
 "Leaves Eclipse The Light (Nick Zammuto Remix)" - 3:23

References

External links

2010 EPs
Eluvium (musician) albums
Temporary Residence Limited albums